USS Register has been the name of more than one United States Navy ship, and may refer to:

USS Register (DE-308), a destroyer escort renamed  on 10 September 1943 while under construction
 USS Register (DE-233), destroyer escort converted during construction into the high-speed transport 

United States Navy ship names